The Painting Pool (translit. Hoze Naghashi) is a 2013 Iranian drama film written and directed by Maziar Miri. The film released on 13 March 2013 in Tehran and centers upon the interpersonal dynamics between a set of mentally challenged parents and their child. Iran reviewed the movie as a potential selection for contention for a 2014 Academy Award for Best Foreign Language Film, but did not select the film.

Synopsis
Maryam (Negar Javaherian) and Reza (Shahab Hosseini) try to do their best in life, but are met with several obstacles due to being mentally challenged. Their son Soheil was born without any defects and initially does not realize how his parents differ from other adults until he begins to grow older. This leads to complications when his teachers request that his mother come to school for a parent-teacher conference, as Soheil is afraid that his parents will humiliate him. As a result, Soheil spends more and more time with Amirali, his teacher's son, and eventually moves in with them after his father loses his job.

Cast
Shahab Hosseini as Reza
Negar Javaherian as Maryam
Hojjat Hassanpour Sargaroui as Mohsen
Fereshteh Sadre Orafaiy
Sepehrad Farzami
Siamak Ehsaei
Elham Korda

Reception
Serat News reviewed the film.

Awards and nominations

References

External links
 
 

2013 films
2013 drama films
2010s Persian-language films
Iranian drama films
Crystal Simorgh for Audience Choice of Best Film winners